Luman L. Cadwell (May 22, 1836 – July 8, 1925) was an American soldier who fought in the American Civil War. Cadwell received the country's highest award for bravery during combat, the Medal of Honor, for his action at the Alabama Bayou, Louisiana on September 20, 1864. He was honored with the award on August 17, 1894.

Biography
Cadwell was born in 1836 and enlisted into the 2nd New York Veteran Cavalry. On September 20, 1864 Cadwell along with another soldier, Albert Westinghouse, swam across the 150 foot Alabama Bayou near New Orleans in order to retrieve a small boat which his company used to gain access to a Confederate camp stationed on an island in the middle of the Bayou and destroy buildings, supplies, artillery and capture Confederate forces.

Medal of Honor citation

See also

List of American Civil War Medal of Honor recipients: A–F

References

1836 births
1925 deaths
American Civil War recipients of the Medal of Honor
People of New York (state) in the American Civil War
Union Army officers
United States Army Medal of Honor recipients